A list of films produced in Japan ordered by year in the 1960s.  For an A-Z of films see :Category:Japanese films.

List of films
Japanese films of 1960
Japanese films of 1961
Japanese films of 1962
Japanese films of 1963
Japanese films of 1964
Japanese films of 1965
Japanese films of 1966
Japanese films of 1967
Japanese films of 1968
Japanese films of 1969

External links
 Japanese film at the Internet Movie Database

1960s
Japanese
Films